France–Yugoslavia relations were post-World War I historical foreign relations between France (Third Republic, Free France, Provisional Government, Fourth Republic and Fifth Republic till 1992) and now split-up Yugoslavia (Kingdom, Government in exile, Democratic Federal Yugoslavia or Socialist Federal Republic of Yugoslavia).

History

Interwar period

Following the earlier experience of alliance between France and the Kingdom of Serbia, Kingdom of Yugoslavia was a strong follower of the French political strategies in the interwar period Central Europe. Yugoslavia Bastille Day was celebrated annually and became a means to commemorate the French lives lost in the Balkans during the World War I. Declaration of Franco-Yugoslav friendship was signed in Belgrade on 11 November 1927 and war ratified in Paris on the same day. In 1928, quoting inopportune timing, French government rejected Yugoslav general staff proposal for a military conversation. On 11 November 1930 Monument of Gratitude to France was opened on the Belgrade Fortress. Following the French participation in the Four-Power Pact pro-French states started to look after their own security instead of excessive reliance on France and on February 9, 1934 Greece, Rumania, Turkey, and Yugoslavia signed the Balkan Pact.

Economic cooperation was nevertheless limited and decreasing which in 1934 led to fact that France ranked sixth among suppliers and eleventh among trade customers of Yugoslavia. Yugoslav king Alexander I of Yugoslavia and French Foreign Minister Louis Barthou were assassinated in Marseilles during his 9 October 1934 state visit to France. The League of Nations stated that "certain Hungarian authorities may have assumed at any rate through negligence, certain responsibilities relative to acts having connection with the preparation of the Marseilles crime. Yugoslav policy in the following period reoriented itself towards rapprochement with Bulgaria, Italy, Hungary and Germany.

World War II
During World War II in Yugoslavia and World War II in France both countries were divided, partially occupied by Axis and with prominent resistance movement emerging in Yugoslavia against the occupiers.

Socialist Yugoslavia
In April 1946 a Franco-Yugoslav friendship society was created in the period in which Belgrade intended to use its relations with France to maintain certain independence. Policy disagreements with Soviet Union led to 1948 Tito–Stalin split after which Yugoslav relations with all Eastern Bloc countries were either suspended or significantly strained while Yugoslavia reoriented its policy towards European neutral countries and eventually to close cooperation with Non-Aligned countries. In 1951-1954 period France, together with United States and United Kingdom participated in the Tripartite Aid programme for Yugoslavia. France's National Assembly ended its participation in the program in 1953 led to a diminishment in its influence in Yugoslavia.

During the Algerian War Yugoslavia provided significant logistical and diplomatic support to the Algerian side which affected its relations with France.  France believed that the close link between Egypt and Yugoslavia would continue to influence strongly its policy towards Algeria. Yugoslavia officially recognized the independence of Algeria on 5 September 1961 as the first country in Europe to do so. Relations started to improve once again after the 1966 and in 1969 Tito even invited France to attend the Non-Aligned Conference. Despite disagreements over Algeria France recognized mediator role which Non-Aligned Yugoslavia (country without colonial past) can play between France and newly independent African countries. Two nations established a Franco-Yugoslav chamber of commerce in Paris in June 1970.

Breakup of Yugoslavia
Contemporary commentators interpreted President of France François Mitterrand's policy during the Yugoslav crisis as being based upon a fear of a resurgent reunified Germany and a historical friendship with Serbia. French diplomacy nevertheless stressed the primacy of a unified common European approach in order not to threaten the Maastricht Treaty nor the national referendum on its passing in September 1992 and was therefore willing to follow the German insistence on Croatian and Slovenian independence.

See also
 Yugoslavia–European Communities relations
 France–Serbia relations
 Croatia–France relations
 France–Kosovo relations
 Yugoslavia at the 1924 Winter Olympics
 Yugoslavia at the 1924 Summer Olympics
 Yugoslavia at the 1968 Winter Olympics
 France at the 1984 Winter Olympics
 Yugoslavia at the 1992 Winter Olympics

References

France–Yugoslavia relations
France
Yugoslavia
Bosnia and Herzegovina–France relations
Croatia–France relations
France–Kosovo relations
France–North Macedonia relations
France–Montenegro relations
France–Serbia relations
France–Slovenia relations